1999 was another tough year for the Waikato Chiefs rugby team in the Super 12 Tournament. This year winning 5 of their 11 games and finished 6th overall on the table, this year the team was coached by Ross Cooper and captained by Michael Collins.

Standing

Results

Squad

Player statistics

Notes and references

http://www.sanzarrugby.com/superrugby/match-centre/?historicalView=1&season=1999&competition=205&match=599053 (BLUES VS CHIEFS GAME, 26 March 1999)

External links
Official Chiefs website
Official Super Rugby website 
Official Facebook page

1999
1999 in New Zealand rugby union
1999 Super 12 season by team